Sergei Prokofiev set about composing his Piano Concerto No. 1 in D-flat major, Op. 10, in 1911, and finished it the next year. The shortest of all his concertos, it is in one movement, about 15 minutes in duration, and dedicated to the “dreaded Tcherepnin.”

Structure
The work's single 15-minute span has the following tempo markings: 
Allegro brioso —
Poco più mosso —
Tempo I —
Meno mosso —
Più mosso (Tempo I) — 
Animato —
Andante assai —
Allegro scherzando — 
Poco più sostenuto — 
Più mosso —
Animato
Described as extroverted, even showy, for much of its length, the concerto begins and ends with the same spacious D-flat theme. Its Andante assai section, in G-sharp minor, offers warm, veiled contrast: a quasi “middle movement.”

Premiere
The concerto was first performed in Moscow on 25 July, 1912, with the composer as soloist and Konstantin Saradzhev conducting. Saradzhev “realized splendidly all my tempos,” wrote Prokofiev afterwards.

Rubinstein Prize
The 22-year-old composer-pianist won the Anton Rubinstein Prize for pianistic accomplishments in an 18 May 1914 performance of the work before the Saint Petersburg Conservatory. He had proposed his own concerto for the programme, reasoning that, though he may not be able to win with a classical concerto, with his own concerto the jury would be “unable to judge whether he was playing well or not.” Competition rules required that the piece be published, so Prokofiev found a publisher willing to produce 20 copies in time for the event. The jury headed by Alexander Glazunov awarded Prokofiev the prize rather reluctantly.

Recordings
This is a partial list. At least 62 recordings exist in all.

† — Part of a complete cycle of the five concertos by this pianist and conductor. There have been relatively few such cycles (14 as of 2020) due to the diversity of the five works and their technical demands, and to the extraordinarily central role played by the conductor, such that a majority of pianists omit at least one or two of them from their repertory. The extant cycles are: Browning/Leinsdorf (Nos. 1 and 2: Dec. 1-8, 1965; No. 3: Nov. 25-27, 1967; No. 4: Nov. 27, 1967; and No. 5: April 25, 1969), Béroff/Masur (all: Jan. 2-7 and Feb. 24-27, 1974), Ashkenazy/Previn (Nos. 1 and 3: Jan. 28-29, 1974; No. 2: Sept. 30 to Oct. 2, 1974; No. 4: April 25, 1975; and No. 5: Dec. 9, 1974), Tacchino/de Froment (No. 1: 1973; Nos. 2 and 3: 1972; and Nos. 4 and 5: 1977), Krainev/Kitaenko (Moscow; Nos. 1 and 2: 1976; No. 3: 1981; and Nos. 4 and 5: 1983), Postnikova/Rozhdestvensky (No. 2: 1983; Nos. 1, 3 and 4: 1985; and No. 5: 1987), Paik/Wit (all: May 13–18, 1991), Krainev/Kitaenko (Frankfurt; Nos. 1 and 3: Jan. 1991; No. 2: Jan. 1992; No. 4: May 1992; and No. 5: May and Aug. 1992), Bronfman/Mehta (Nos. 1, 3 and 5: Oct. 14-25, 1991; and Nos. 2 and 4: July 8–17, 1993), Demidenko/Lazarev (Nos. 2 and 3: Dec. 19-20, 1995; and Nos. 1, 4 and 5: Jan. 2-3, 1998), Toradze/Gergiev (No. 1: July 1997; Nos. 2 and 5: July 1–7, 1995; and Nos. 3 and 4: July 1996), Marshev/Willén (all: July 30 to Aug. 10, 2001), El Bacha/Ōno (all live: Sept. 24-26, 2004), and Bavouzet/Noseda (Nos. 1 and 4: Nov. 5, 2012; No. 2: Aug. 8-9, 2013; No. 3: June 29, 2012; and No. 5: Sept. 11, 2013).

References

External links
 
 

Piano concertos by Sergei Prokofiev
1912 compositions
Compositions in D-flat major